The 2016–17 season is Bury's second consecutive season in League One and their 132nd year in existence. Along with competing in League One, the club will also participate in the FA Cup, League Cup and JP Trophy.

The season covers the period from 1 July 2016 to 30 June 2017.

Transfers

Transfers in

Transfers out

Loans in

Loans out

Competitions

Pre-season friendlies

League One

League table

Matches

FA Cup

EFL Cup

EFL Trophy

References

Bury
Bury F.C. seasons